James Anderson was a Scottish amateur footballer who played as an outside left in the Scottish League for Queen's Park.

Personal life 
Anderson served as a second lieutenant in the Highland Light Infantry during the First World War.

Career statistics

References

Year of birth missing
Scottish footballers
Scottish Football League players
British Army personnel of World War I
Highland Light Infantry officers
Association football outside forwards
Queen's Park F.C. players
Date of death missing